Ioannes is a given name. Notable people with the name include:

 Ioannes (fl. 423–425), a Roman usurper
 Ioannes Kegen, a Pecheneg military commander
 Ioannes I (disambiguation)
 Ioannes II (disambiguation)
 Ioannes III (disambiguation)
 Ioannes IV (disambiguation)
 Ioannes V (disambiguation)
 Ioannes VI (disambiguation)
 Ioannes VII (disambiguation)
 Ioannes VIII (disambiguation)

See also 
 
 John (given name)
 Hovhannes